Antoni Kot (born 26 March 1945) is a Polish former footballer. He played in one match for the Poland national football team in 1971. Besides Poland, he played in Denmark.

References

External links
 

1945 births
Living people
Polish footballers
Poland international footballers
Place of birth missing (living people)
Association football midfielders
Polish football managers
Odra Opole players
Odra Opole managers